Swing Out, Sweet Land is a 1970 American TV special starring John Wayne. It was Wayne's first TV special and looked at the history of American settlement.

Cast
John Wayne
Ann-Margret
Lucille Ball
Jack Benny
Celeste Holm
Bing Crosby
Bob Hope
Johnny Cash
Dean Martin
Robert B. Shepard
Glen Campbell
Tommy Smothers
Ricky Nelson

Not all cast members were credited.

Presentation
The overall theme is pro-United States patriotism, given a light treatment in a series of often-humorous cameo vignettes.

American history is portrayed by a cast of contemporary stars (and others).  Wayne is host, leading a star-studded cast of actors, dancers, humorists and musicians, participating in most of the vignettes.  As the United states is formed and expanded, Wayne walks a large map on the floor, which shows the growth of the continental United States.  

There is a tongue-in-cheek ("yarn-spinning") treatment in most of the scenes, including a running gag originally offered by Bob Hope, regarding Paul Revere: "How he ever got that horse up on the seventh floor, I'll never know!"  A number of jokes and puns were references to popular culture of the late 1960s or other anachronisms, such as George Burns, walking through George Washington's inaugural ball in modern clothes and greeting his friend, Jack Benny.

The last few minutes were inspirational words from Wayne, then the stars join in singing God Bless America.

Production
Interiors were filmed at NBC Studios, Burbank, California, some scenes shot before a studio audience.  Most location shots were made at and around the Independence Hall and Colonial Village which had been built at Knott's Berry Farm, in Buena Park, California.

Reception
It was the highest rated show of the week it aired.

References

External links
Swing Out Sweet Land at IMDb
Swing Out Sweet Land at Letterbox DVD

1970 television specials
Cultural depictions of George Washington
John Wayne